Tönnersjö Hundred was a hundred in Halland, Sweden. It is probably named after either the village Tönnersjö in Tönnersjö parish or the (larger) village Tönnersa in Eldsberga parish.

It was composed of the following parishes (all now in Halmstad Municipality): Breared, Eldsberga, Enslöv, Snöstorp, Trönninge and Tönnersjö.

References

Hundreds of Halland